The Roman Catholic Diocese of Teotihuacan (erected 3 December 2008) is a suffragan diocese of the Archdiocese of Tlalnepantla.

Ordinaries
Guillermo Francisco Escobar Galicia (2008–Present)

External links and references

References 

Teotihuacan
Teotihuacan, Roman Catholic Diocese of
Teotihuacan
Teotihuacan
2008 establishments in Mexico